All About Soap was a fortnightly UK magazine founded in October 1999. It was released on Tuesdays. Storylines of the shows it covers are from soap operas shown in the United Kingdom and from Australia, including EastEnders, Coronation Street, Emmerdale, Doctors, Hollyoaks, Neighbours and Home and Away.

History and profile
The magazine launched in 1999 as a sister magazine to Inside Soap and as a rival to Soaplife which had taken off just months earlier, the same year.

Out of the three leading soap magazines, it is the only one to have featured a celebrity column written by a soap star. Emmerdale's Lucy Pargeter (who plays Chas Dingle), Verity Rushworth (Donna Windsor) and Matthew Bose (Paul Lambert) have all written the celebrity column.

The magazine also launched the All About Soap Bubble Awards.

The magazine had a circulation of 68,487 copies in June 2013. Its circulation was 64,376 copies in February 2014. The magazine's circulation was 34,678 copies in the six months from June to December 2015.

After seventeen years, the magazine ceased publication in December 2016.

References

1999 establishments in the United Kingdom
2016 disestablishments in the United Kingdom
Biweekly magazines published in the United Kingdom
Defunct magazines published in the United Kingdom
Magazines about soap operas
Magazines established in 1999
Magazines disestablished in 2016
Magazines published in London
Television magazines published in the United Kingdom